Respectable by Proxy is a 1920 American silent drama film directed by J. Stuart Blackton and starring Sylvia Breamer, Robert Gordon and William R. Dunn.

Cast
 Sylvia Breamer as Betty Blair 
 Robert Gordon as John Stanley Hale 
 William R. Dunn as Clinton Hale 
 Bessie Stinson as Rita Middleton 
 Eulalie Jensen as Elizabeth Roddard 
 Margaret Barry as Madame Hale 
 Morgan Thorpe as Clayton Walpole

References

Bibliography
 Darby, William. Masters of Lens and Light: A Checklist of Major Cinematographers and Their Feature Films. Scarecrow Press, 1991.

External links

1920 films
1920 drama films
Silent American drama films
Films directed by J. Stuart Blackton
American silent feature films
1920s English-language films
Pathé Exchange films
American black-and-white films
1920s American films